The Devon Railway Centre is in the village of Bickleigh in Mid Devon, England, at the former Cadeleigh railway station on the closed Great Western Railway branch from Exeter to Dulverton, also known as the Exe Valley Railway. The centre operates a  narrow gauge passenger railway and has the largest narrow gauge collection in the South West. There is also a  gauge miniature railway and a model railway at the centre. The original Victorian station has been restored.

External links
The Centre website

2 ft gauge railways in England
Heritage railways in Devon
Railway museums in England
Museums in Devon